The 1958 Colgate Red Raiders football team was an American football team that represented Colgate University as an independent during the 1958 NCAA University Division football season. In its second season under head coach Fred Rice, the team compiled a 1–8 record. Robert Conklin was the team captain. 

The team played its home games at Colgate Athletic Field in Hamilton, New York.

Schedule

Leading players 
Statistical leaders for the 1958 Red Raiders included: 
 Rushing: Bernard Dailey, 292 yards and 2 touchdowns on 77 attempts
 Passing: Raymond Harding, 337 yards, 36 completions and 2 touchdowns on 94 attempts
 Receiving: Alfred Jamison, 173 yards and 1 touchdown on 17 receptions
 Total offense: Raymond Harding, 426 yards (337 passing, 89 rushing)
 Scoring: Bernard Dailey, 12 points from 2 touchdowns
 All-purpose yards: R. Douglas Ammon, 406 yards (150 rushing, 136 kickoff returning, 77 punt returning, 24 interception returning, 19 receiving)

References

Colgate
Colgate Raiders football seasons
Colgate Red Raiders football